Fulvio Bacchelli (born 22 January 1951 in Trieste) is a former Italian rally driver, who won Rally New Zealand in 1977, a round of the World Rally Championship.

Career
Bacchelli began rallying in 1971. In 1974 he joined the works Fiat team, finishing sixth on that year's Tour de Corse. He finished fourth in the 1975 Monte Carlo Rally. In 1977 he won Rally New Zealand, or the South Pacific Rally as it was then known, in his Fiat 131 Abarth. At the end of the year Fiat and Lancia's rally departments merged and he lost his factory drive.

WRC victories
{|class="wikitable"
! # 
!Event
!Season
!Co-driver
!Car
|-
|1
| 8th South Pacific Rally
|1977
|Francesco Rossetti
|Fiat 131 Abarth
|}

References

External links
Profile at World Rally Archive
Profile at RallyBase

Living people
1951 births
Sportspeople from Trieste
Italian rally drivers
World Rally Championship drivers